Acton Central railway station is on the North London line, between  and , in Travelcard Zone 3. It is also where trains change power supply from overhead line equipment (25 kV AC) to third rail (750 V DC), or vice versa, depending on direction of travel (overhead line is used to Stratford, third rail to Richmond).

History

The station was opened as Acton on 1 August 1853 by the North and South Western Junction Railway (N&SWJR), but was renamed Acton Central on 1 November 1925. The N&SWJR was leased jointly to the London and North Western Railway (LNWR), the Midland Railway (MR) and the North London Railway (NLR) from 1871, but only the NLR operated passenger trains on the N&SWJR until operation of the NLR (and thus of the N&SWJR also) was taken over by the LNWR in 1909. Under the terms of the Railways Act 1921, the LNWR and MR amalgamated (together with some others) at the start of 1923 to form the London, Midland and Scottish Railway, which then absorbed both the NLR and the N&SWJR. The line then passed on to the London Midland Region of British Railways on nationalisation in 1948.

When sectorisation was introduced, the station was served by Network SouthEast until the privatisation of British Railways.

Between 1875 and 1902 it was connected with  via the Dudding Hill line, which branches off the North London line between Acton Central and Willesden Junction. Harlesden (Midland) railway station was the next stop on the line north. The Dudding Hill line is still open today, but only carries freight.

Acton Central station was named for closure by the 1963 Beeching Report, also known as the Beeching Axe.

Acton Central was in Zone 2 until 2 January 2008.

In 2011, the platforms were lengthened to allow longer trains.

Services
Acton Central currently has the following London Overground (North London Line) services, which are operated by Class 378 trainsets:

Off-peak:
4tph (trains per hour) to  via  and 
4tph to

Connections
London Buses routes 70, 207, 218, 607 and night routes N7, N207 and N266 serve the station.

References

External links

 Excel file displaying National Rail station usage information for 2005/06 
 BBC News article
 Map from BBC article
 

Railway stations in the London Borough of Ealing
Railway stations served by London Overground
Former North and South Western Junction Railway stations
Railway stations in Great Britain opened in 1853
Acton, London